Asdrubal Mendes Bentes (27 July 1939 – 27 April 2020) was a Brazilian politician and lawyer from the state of Pará.

Life 
He represented Pará in the national Chamber of Deputies, the lower house of the National Congress of Brazil, for several tenures beginning in 1987. Most recently, he served in the Chamber of Deputies for four consecutive terms from 1 February 2001, to 26 March 2014. He was also a former president of the Paysandu Sport Club, a Brazilian football team based in Belém.

Death
Bentes was hospitalized in a Belém intensive care unit for COVID-19 during the COVID-19 pandemic in Brazil on 23 April 2020. He died from complications of COVID-19 at the Hospital Aberlardo Santos in the Icoaraci district of Belém on April 27, 2020, at the age of 80.

References

1939 births
2020 deaths
20th-century Brazilian lawyers
Members of the Chamber of Deputies (Brazil) from Pará
Association football executives
Brazilian sports executives and administrators
Brazilian Democratic Movement politicians
People from Amazonas (Brazilian state)
Deaths from the COVID-19 pandemic in Pará